Peter Gethers (born 1955) is an American publisher, screenwriter and author of television shows, films, newspaper and magazine articles, and novelist; the author of several books, including the bestseller The Cat Who Went to Paris, published in the UK under the title A Cat Called Norton, the first of the Norton the cat trilogy about his Scottish Fold, Norton. He lives in New York City and Sag Harbor, New York.

Biography
Born to a Jewish family, Gethers attended the University of California at Berkeley from 1970 to 1972.

An avid baseball fan, Gethers is a founding member of the first Rotisserie Baseball League, the 1980 group that started the fantasy sports craze.

His brother Eric is also a writer, and his father was a television producer.

Gethers' other works include five novels under the pseudonym of Russell Andrews; Gideon, Icarus, Aphrodite, Midas and Hades.

Novels

As Peter Gethers
The Dandy
Getting Blue
The Cat Who Went to Paris (1991) (biographical) (the same book has been published under A Cat Called Norton, UK 2009.)
A Cat Abroad (biographical) (the same book has been published under For The Love of Norton, UK 2010.)
The Cat Who'll Live Forever (biographical, 2001)
Ask Bob (August 2013)

As Russell Andrews
Gideon
Icarus
Aphrodite
Midas
Hades

Nonfiction works
Rotisserie League Baseball (coauthor)

References

External links
 

1955 births
Living people
University of California, Berkeley alumni
People from Sag Harbor, New York
American male novelists
American male screenwriters
Jewish American screenwriters
Place of birth missing (living people)
20th-century American novelists
20th-century American male writers
Screenwriters from New York (state)
21st-century American Jews